Ethan Maniquis is an American film director and editor. Maniquis co-directed the 2010 film Machete and directed the 2022 film Limonada as well commercials and music videos.

Filmography

Editor

Other

References

External links

Living people
Year of birth missing (living people)
American film editors